Vincent Lepetit is a French computer scientist, professor at the University of Bordeaux. He received his PhD degree in computer vision in 2001 from the University of Nancy.

Lepetit leads a research group in computer vision for augmented reality at the Institute for Computer Graphics and Vision, TU Graz. He was formerly professor at the Institute for Computer Graphics and Vision at the same institution from February 2014 to December 2016. He is a senior member of the Institut Universitaire de France.

Lepetit's research interests include machine learning and 3D computer vision.

Selected research
Calonder, Michael, et al. "Brief: Binary robust independent elementary features." European conference on computer vision. Springer, Berlin, Heidelberg, 2010.
Lepetit, Vincent, Francesc Moreno-Noguer, and Pascal Fua. "Epnp: An accurate o (n) solution to the pnp problem." International journal of computer vision 81.2 (2009): 155.
Tola, Engin, Vincent Lepetit, and Pascal Fua. "Daisy: An efficient dense descriptor applied to wide-baseline stereo." IEEE transactions on pattern analysis and machine intelligence 32.5 (2009): 815–830.
Lepetit, Vincent, and Pascal Fua. "Keypoint recognition using randomized trees." IEEE transactions on pattern analysis and machine intelligence 28.9 (2006): 1465–1479.

References

French computer scientists
Academic staff of the University of Bordeaux
Living people
Year of birth missing (living people)